Andrey Voronenko (born 1972) is a Russian mathematician, Professor, Dr.Sc., a professor at the Faculty of Computer Science at the Moscow State University.

He defended the thesis «Methods for representing discrete functions in problems of calculating, testing and recognizing properties» for the degree of Doctor of Physical and Mathematical Sciences (2008).

Was awarded the title of Professor (2009).

Author of 16 books and more than 80 scientific articles.

References

Literature

External links
 MSU CMC
 Scientific works of Andrey Voronenko
 Scientific works of Andrey Voronenko

Russian computer scientists
Russian mathematicians
Living people
Academic staff of Moscow State University
1972 births
Moscow State University alumni